Aupaluk Airport  is located  east of Aupaluk, Quebec, Canada.

Airlines and destinations

References

External links
Page about this airport on COPA's Places to Fly airport directory

Certified airports in Nord-du-Québec